Jean Baptiste Baudreau Dit Graveline II (1715–1757) was a colonist in French Louisiana, and is one of the few persons to ever be executed in the Americas by the breaking wheel.

Early life
Jean Baptiste Baudreau Dit Graveline II was born in the 1710s (presumably 1715) on the French Louisiana settlement of Massacre Island (modern day Dauphin Island, Alabama). He was the son of Sieur Jean Baptiste Baudreau Dit Graveline, the captain of the Pascagoula militia (and the first settler of Pascagoula, Mississippi, and one of the original settlers of the old Mobile), and an Indian woman named Suzanne. Having originally been born as an illegitimate child, his father married the Indian woman in 1727 in an attempt to legitimize him. In 1734, Baudreau married Marie Catherine Viconneau, a Protestant, with whom he would have all of his legitimate children.

Illegitimate children
In the 1740s, he began having an affair with a girl named Marie Henriette Huet, whose family owned a plantation in the area around modern day Portersville Bay (Census of Inhabitants in the Area of Biloxi and Mobile, Dated June 26, 1721). He had two illegitimate children with her, the majority of whom would use the surname of Baptiste (in modern-day Mobile, this has evolved into Battiste). One of these children is regarded by modern historians to be the founder of Coq'd'Inde (Coden, Alabama).

Conflicts with the French authorities and execution in New Orleans
During the course of his life, he had problems with French authorities and was subject to imprisonment several times. Despite his warm relations with Bienville, he was regarded with suspicion by some French authorities, because of his unique relationship with the local Native American population, due in large part because of his half Indian heritage. At the same time however, he was a vital part of the French colonial operation, as he was often the one who was sent on trading excursions into Creek territory. In the 1740s, he had been imprisoned by French authorities on kidnapping charges related to an excursion he took to Havana, Cuba. He broke out of prison and took refuge in Native American villages north of Mobile. The Native Americans refused to engage in any further trade with the French until he was pardoned. Governor Vandrieul petitioned for King Louis XV to drop the charges, which he did.

In the 1750s, Baudreau was imprisoned at the French prison on modern day Cat Island, Mississippi for charges of illegally salvaging wrecked ships. In 1757 soldiers stationed at the prison staged a mutiny and killed the commanding officer. They took Graveline hostage and forced him to be their guide as they went into the hinterlands away from the colony. The mutineers provided Baudreau with a signed certificate saying he had not been a party to the mutiny. Despite this, Governor Kerlerec had him court martialed and he was sentenced to death. He was executed by breaking wheel in front of the St. Louis Cathedral in New Orleans, Louisiana on June 7, 1757. The French authorities subsequently mutilated what were left of his remains and deposited them in the Mississippi River. A marker commemorating his life and brutal execution stands near the site.

Relations with his father
In 1747, while he was on the run from French authorities following his prison escape, the mother of his illegitimate children, Marie Henriette Huet, filed a claim with the French authorities for support of her children. The senior Graveline, the grandfather of the children, agreed to help provide for their support.

In 1763, when his father died, he disowned his son in his will, stating that he had married his mother only to legitimize him, and then proceeded to list a number of reasons justifying the disinheritance.

Impact on Gulf Coast culture and life
Graveline Bay, which borders southern Mississippi and southern Alabama, is named for his father.

Urbain Baudreau Dit Graveline Park in Montreal, Quebec was named for his grandfather, who was an important figure in the history of Quebec.

Baudreau was the 6th great-grandfather of singer/songwriter Jimmy Buffett, the 6th great-grandfather of actress Diane Ladd, 7th great-grandfather of actress Laura Dern, and the 5th great-grandfather of Mobile, Alabama cook, socialite and television personality Connie Bea Hope.

His 3rd great-grandson, Charles Clements, was one of the Confederate soldiers executed by Union authorities at Ship Island, Mississippi.

Baudreau's affair with Marie Henriette Huet served as the basis for the book "The Passion of the Princes" by author Eloise Genest.

A marker stands near the site of his grisly execution. Descendents held a rally in New Orleans in 2007 to commemorate his life.

Sources

18th century in New Orleans
18th-century executions
People of Louisiana (New France)
History of Mobile, Alabama
Recipients of French royal pardons
1715 births
1757 deaths